Kmiec is a surname. Notable people with the surname include: 

Aldona Kmiec (born 1977), Australian contemporary artist
Douglas Kmiec (born 1951), American legal scholar
Edward Kmiec (1936–2020), American Roman Catholic bishop
Staś Kmieć, American dancer
Tom Kmiec (born 1981), Canadian politician

See also
 

Polish-language surnames